William "Jamie" Leach (born August 25, 1969) is a Canadian-born American former National Hockey League right wing. He is the son of former NHLer Reggie Leach. He was included on both Stanley Cup winning pictures with Pittsburgh in 1991 and 1992.

Leach grew up in Cherry Hill, New Jersey and played hockey at Cherry Hill High School East.

Leach did not qualify for a Cup inscription in 1991 as he had played too few NHL games that season (seven regular season games). He played enough games with the Pittsburgh Penguins in 1992 to get his name on the Stanley Cup.

Career statistics

References

External links 

1969 births
Living people
Canadian ice hockey right wingers
Cherry Hill High School East alumni
Cincinnati Cyclones (IHL) players
Cleveland Lumberjacks players
Florida Panthers players
Hamilton Steelhawks players
Hartford Whalers players
Ice hockey players from New Jersey
Ice hockey people from Winnipeg
Muskegon Lumberjacks players
New Westminster Bruins players
Niagara Falls Thunder players
Nottingham Panthers players
People from Cherry Hill, New Jersey
Pittsburgh Penguins draft picks
Pittsburgh Penguins players
Rochester Americans players
San Diego Gulls (IHL) players
Sheffield Steelers players
South Carolina Stingrays players
Sportspeople from Camden County, New Jersey
Springfield Indians players
Stanley Cup champions
First Nations sportspeople
Canadian expatriate ice hockey players in England